Rotunda is a commune in Olt County, Oltenia, Romania. It is composed of a single village, Rotunda.

The nearest city is Caracal, at a distance of nearly 20 km.

References

Communes in Olt County
Localities in Oltenia